Alicia Marie Sixtos is an American actress. Sixtos is best known for her role as Maya Martinez in the Hulu series East Los High and her recurring role as Carmen Cruz in the ABC Family's series The Fosters.

Early years
Sixtos was born and raised in San Francisco and has three sisters. Sixtos is of Mexican and Portuguese descent. Sixtos moved to Los Angeles in 2005, and began work as a model for ad agencies.

Career
Sixtos has done many roles in many television series and movies including The Avengers, King of the Hill, Californication, CSI: Crime Scene Investigation, and General Hospital. In 2006, she had the lead role in the drama film Quinceañera. In 2014, she would portray the role of Carmen on the show The Fosters.

Personal life 
On October 11, 2018, Sixtos came out on Twitter as pansexual for National Coming Out Day. Sixtos and actor Bex Taylor-Klaus married in October 2020.

Filmography

References

External links
 
 

Living people
Actresses from San Francisco
American film actresses
American television actresses
American actresses of Mexican descent
Hispanic and Latino American actresses
LGBT Hispanic and Latino American people
Pansexual actresses
LGBT people from California
American LGBT actors
American people of Portuguese descent
21st-century LGBT people
21st-century American women
Year of birth missing (living people)